Tropical Depression Ten may refer to several different tropical cyclones named Ten.

In the Atlantic Ocean:
Tropical Storm Ten (1956)
Hurricane Ten (1962)
Tropical Storm Ten (1965)
Tropical Depression Ten of the 1967 Atlantic hurricane season
The 10th tropical depression of the 1969 Atlantic hurricane season
Tropical Depression Ten of the 1970 Atlantic hurricane season
Tropical Depression Ten of the 1972 Atlantic hurricane season
Tropical Depression Ten of the 1975 Atlantic hurricane season
Tropical Depression Ten of the 1976 Atlantic hurricane season
Tropical Depression Ten, a storm in the 1988 Atlantic hurricane season
Tropical Depression Ten (1991)
Tropical Depression Ten (1993)
Tropical Depression Ten (1994)
Tropical Depression Ten (2004)
Tropical Depression Ten (2005)
Tropical Depression Ten (2007)
Tropical Depression Ten (2011)
Tropical Depression Ten (2020)

In the Eastern Pacific Ocean:
Tropical Depression Ten-E, a storm in the 1978 Pacific hurricane season
Tropical Depression Ten-E (2010)